WMKE may refer to:

 WMKE-CD, a television station (channel 36, virtual 21) licensed to Milwaukee, Wisconsin, United States
 Kerteh Airport (ICAO code WMKE)